Zwölf Stücke, Op. 80, is a group of twelve pieces for organ by Max Reger. He composed them in Munich in 1902 and 1904. They were published by C. F. Peters in Leipzig in September 1904.

History and movements 
The pieces are character pieces of medium difficulty, as a contrast to his major organ works. Reger had written such works already as a student in Wiesbaden. He turned to the organ in Weiden. On a request of the publisher Henri Hinrichsen of C. F. Peters, Reger composed 15 pieces in Munich in 1902. Peters published twelve in Leipzig in August 1902 as Zwölf Stücke. Reger used the three still unpublished pieces (Fughette, Gigue, Intermezzo) and composed additional nine pieces in 1904, to form a similar set of works that can be played in sequence or individually. In Reger's lifetime, performers often combined movements from different collections.

The twelve pieces were published by C. F. Peters in Leipzig in September 1904, in two books (Heft) of six pieces each. Reger dedicated the pieces of Heft 1 to Franz Grunicke, an organist in Berlin, and those of Heft 2 to Otto Burkert.

The titles and keys are:
 Präludium (Prelude), E minor
 Fughette (Fugue), E minor
 Canzonetta (Canzonetta), G minor
 Gigue (Gigue), D minor
 Ave Maria, D-flat minor
 Intermezzo (Intermezzo), G minor
 Scherzo (Scherzo), F-sharp minor
 Romanze (Romance), A minor
 Perpetuum mobile (Perpetuum mobile), F minor
 Intermezzo, D major
 Toccata (Toccata), A minor
 Fuge (Fugue), A minor

In the edition of Reger's complete works by the Max-Reger-Institute, they were published in volumes 5–7.

Recordings 
The organist Hans-Jürgen Kaiser recorded ten of the twelve pieces in volume 11 of the complete organ works by Reger, along with the Chorale Preludes, Op. 79b, played on the Rieger-Sauer organ in the Fulda Cathedral, while numbers 7 and 8 were played by Martin Wetzel on the Klais organ of the Trier Cathedral and appear on volume 8.

References

Bibliography

External links 
 
 12 Stücke op. 80 / Heft 1 Edition Peters
 Max Reger / 1898 Rückkehr nach Weiden (in German) max-reger-orgel.de
 The Greatness of Reger—as Revealed by Paul Jacobs, Organist, at Juilliard newyorkarts.net, 26 September 2014
 Ursula Heim: "... meine Orgelsachen sind schwer ..." / Ein Plädoyer für den «leichten» Einstieg in die Orgelwerke Max Regers, in Form eines fiktiven Interviews rkv.ch
 Reger – Organ Works Volume 11 prestoclassical.co.uk

Compositions for organ
1904 compositions
Compositions by Max Reger